Družetić is a village in Serbia. It is situated on the banks of the Ub river in the Koceljeva municipality, in the Mačva District of Central Serbia. The village had a Serb ethnic majority and a population of 501 in 2002.

Historical population

1948: 1,205
1953: 1,181
1961: 1,104
1971: 1,012
1981: 983
1991: 812
2002: 669

See also
List of places in Serbia

References

Populated places in Mačva District